The Roman Catholic Diocese of Eséka is a diocese located in the city of Eséka in the Ecclesiastical province of Douala in Cameroon.

History
 March 22, 1993: Established as Diocese of Eséka from the Metropolitan Archdiocese of Douala

Special churches
The cathedral is the Cathédrale Notre Dame de Fatima in Eseka.

Bishops
 Bishops of Eséka (Roman rite), in reverse chronological order
 Bishop François Achille Eyabi (November 14, 2020 -   )
 Bishop Dieudonné Bogmis (October 15, 2004  – August 25, 2018)
 Bishop Jean-Bosco Ntep (March 22, 1993  – October 15, 2004), appointed Bishop of Edéa

Other priest of this diocese who became bishop
Sosthène Léopold Bayemi Matjei, appointed Bishop of Obala in 2009

See also
Roman Catholicism in Cameroon

References

External links
 GCatholic.org

Roman Catholic dioceses in Cameroon
Christian organizations established in 1993
Roman Catholic dioceses and prelatures established in the 20th century
Roman Catholic Ecclesiastical Province of Douala